Asthenotricha amblycoma is a moth in the family Geometridae first described by Louis Beethoven Prout in 1935. It is found in Equatorial Guinea, Cameroon and Kenya.

References

Moths described in 1935
Asthenotricha
Moths of Africa